Pinus taiwanensis, the Taiwan red pine, is a species of conifer in the family Pinaceae endemic to Taiwan.

Taxonomy
It is a close relative of Pinus luchuensis of Japan and P. hwangshanensis of China, sometimes considered as a subspecies of the former. Sometimes P. hwangshanensis from China are also referred to as P. taiwanensis.
P. taiwanensis var. fragilissima and P. taiwanensis var. taiwanensis are the two varieties of this species.

Description
Needles are in bundles of two.

References

taiwanensis
Endemic flora of Taiwan
Trees of Taiwan
Least concern plants
Taxonomy articles created by Polbot